Crestwood Publications, also known as Feature Publications, was a magazine publisher that also published comic books from the 1940s through the 1960s. Its title Prize Comics contained what is considered the first ongoing horror comic-book feature, Dick Briefer's "Frankenstein". Crestwood is best known for its Prize Group imprint, published in the late 1940s to mid-1950s through packagers Joe Simon and Jack Kirby, who created such historically prominent titles as the horror comic Black Magic, the creator-owned superhero satire Fighting American, and the first romance comic title, Young Romance.

For much of its history, Crestwood's publishers were Teddy Epstein and Mike Bleier. In the 1940s the company's general manager was Maurice Rosenfeld, and in the 1950s the general manager was M.R. Reese. In the mid-1950s, the company office manager was Nevin Fidler (who later became Simon & Kirby's business manager).

In addition to Simon and Kirby, notable Crestwood/Prize contributors included Leonard Starr, Mort Meskin, John Prentice, Joe Maneely, John Severin, Will Elder, Carmine Infantino, Bruno Premiani, Dick Ayers, George Klein, Jack Abel, Ed Winiarski, and Dick Briefer.

History

Origins: Prize Comics 

In 1940, Crestwood's Prize Publications, already established as a producer of pulp magazines, jumped onto the superhero bandwagon with the new title Prize Comics. The first issue (March 1940) featured the non-superpowered, costumed crime fighter K the Unknown, whose name was changed to the Black Owl in issue #2 (April 1940).

In Prize Comics #7 (December 1940), writer-artist Dick Briefer introduced the eight-page feature "New Adventures of Frankenstein", an updated version of 19th-century novelist Mary Shelley's much-adapted Frankenstein monster. Considered by comics historians including Don Markstein "America's first ongoing comic book series to fall squarely within the horror genre", the feature, set in New York City circa 1930, starred a guttural, rampaging creature actually dubbed "Frankenstein" (unlike Shelley's nameless original monster).

Simon and Kirby's Prize Group

Young Romance 
Launched with a cover date of September 1947, the Prize Group title Young Romance signaled its distinction from traditional superhero and genre comics with a cover banner stating the series was "designed for the more adult readers of comics". Told from a first person perspective, underlining its claim to be recounting "true" stories, the title was an instant success, "bec[oming] Jack and Joe's biggest hit in years" and selling "millions of copies" and a staggering 92% of its print run. Crestwood increased the print run by the third issue to triple the initial numbers, as well as upgraded the title from bimonthly to monthly through issues #13–72 (Sept. 1949 – Aug. 1954).

Within a year and a half, Simon & Kirby were launching companion titles for Crestwood to capitalize on the success of this new genre. The first issue of Young Love (Feb. 1949) also sold well with "indistinguishable" content from its parent-title. Further spin-off titles Young Brides (married couples' stories) and In Love ("book-length" stories) also followed from Crestwood/Prize, and were produced by the Simon & Kirby stable of artists and writers.

Black Magic 
The long-running horror/suspense title Black Magic debuted in 1950. According to Jack Kirby, the idea for Spider-Man originated with him and Simon, who developed a character called The Silver Spider for Black Magic, who was subsequently not used. Ironically, eventual Spider-Man co-creator Steve Ditko drew a six-page story in Black Magic vol. 4, #3 (Dec. 1953).

Controversy 
In 1954, a Crestwood/Prize salesman urged Kirby and Simon to launch their own comics company, Mainline Publications, while the duo continued to produce work for Crestwood under contract. When the duo rearranged and republished artwork from an old Crestwood story in the Mainline title In Love, Crestwood refused to pay Simon and Kirby. After reviewing Crestwood's finances, Simon & Kirby's attorney stated that the company owed them $130,000 over the past seven years. Crestwood paid them $10,000 in addition to their recent delayed payments.

Decline 
Crestwood gave up publishing comics in 1963, selling off its remaining romance comics to publisher DC Comics. It continued to publish humor magazines, such as Sick, up until 1968 (when Sick was acquired by Hewfred Publications).

Comic-book characters
Airmale
American Eagle
Atomic Man
Black Owl
Blue Streak
Bulldog Denny
Captain Gallant
Dr. Dekkar, Master of Monsters
Dr. Frost
The Futureman & Jupiter
Green Lama (also published in pulp magazines and by Spark Publications)
Junior Rangers
Master Magician
Power Nelson
Ted O'Neil
Yank & Doodle

Titles published

References

Notes

Sources

External links

Crestwood/Prize characters at International Superheroes

 
Defunct comics and manga publishing companies
Defunct companies based in New York City
American companies established in 1940
American companies disestablished in 1968
Publishing companies established in 1940
Publishing companies disestablished in 1968
1940 establishments in New York (state)
1968 disestablishments in New York (state)
Publishing companies based in New York City